Halostella (common abbreviation Hsl.) is a genus of halophilic archaea in the family of Halobacteriaceae.

References

Archaea genera
Taxa described in 2016
Halobacteria